Michael E. Brown (born 29 October 1959) is an American academic. He formerly served as Dean of the Elliott School of International Affairs of the George Washington University, where he currently serves as Professor of International Affairs, Political Science, and Gender Studies.

Career
Brown received a Ph.D. in Government from Cornell University.

He was Senior Fellow in U.S. Security Policy at the International Institute for Strategic Studies in London (1988 to 1994). He then became Associate Director of the International Security Program at the Belfer Center for Science and International Affairs at Harvard University (1994–1998). In 1998 he joined the faculty of the Edmund A. Walsh School of Foreign Service at Georgetown University, becoming Director of Georgetown's Center for Peace and Security Studies in 2000. 

In 2005, he was appointed Dean of the Elliott School of International Affairs and Professor of International Affairs and Political Science at the George Washington University.  He held that position until 2015, after which he continued at the school, as a faculty member with a research focus on international security.

He is well-known at the George Washington University for wearing his signature orange necktie while giving lectures, except the week of Halloween.

Published works
He is the author of several books:
 Flying Blind: The Politics of the U.S. Strategic Bomber Program, Ithaca: Cornell University Press, 1992. . Winner of the Edgar Furniss National Security Book Award.

He is also the editor or co-editor of :
 Do Democracies Win Their Wars? Cambridge, Massachusetts: MIT Press, 2011. 
 Going Nuclear: Nuclear Proliferation and International Security in the 21st Century. Cambridge: MIT Press, 2010. 
 Primacy and Its Discontents: American Power and International Stability. Cambridge, Massachusetts: MIT Press, 2008.
 Offense, Defense, and War. Cambridge, Massachusetts: MIT Press, 2004.
 New Global Dangers: Changing Dimensions of International Security. Cambridge, Massachusetts: MIT Press, 2004
 Rational Choice and Security Studies: Stephen Walt and His Critics.  Cambridge, Massachusetts: MIT Press, 2000.
 America's Strategic Choices. Cambridge, Massachusetts: MIT Press, 2000.
 The Rise of China. Cambridge, Massachusetts: MIT, 2000.
 The Costs of Conflict: Prevention and Cure in the Global Arena. Lanham, Md: Rowman & Littlefield Publishers, 1999.
 East Asian Security. Cambridge, Massachusetts: MIT Press, 1998.
 Nationalism and Ethnic Conflict. Cambridge, Massachusetts: MIT Press, 1997.
 Debating the Democratic Peace. Cambridge, Massachusetts: MIT Press, 1996.
 The International Dimensions of Internal Conflict. Cambridge, Massachusetts: MIT Press, 1996.

References

External links
 Official web site at George Washington

George Washington University faculty
George Washington University deans
1959 births
Living people